The family Corydalidae contains the megalopterous insects known as dobsonflies and fishflies. Making up about one dozen genera, they occur primarily throughout the Northern Hemisphere, both temperate and tropical, and South America.

They are sizeable Megaloptera, with a body usually larger than 25 mm (1 inch). They often have long filamentous antennae, though in male fishflies they are characteristically feathered. Ocelli are present; the fourth tarsal segment is cylinder-shaped. The four large wings are translucent, smoky grey, or mixed, and the anterior pair is slightly longer than the posterior one. Their aquatic larvae are used as fish bait and are called hellgrammites.

The eastern dobsonfly, Corydalus cornutus, is the most well-known North American species among the dobsonflies. These genera have distinctive elongated mandibles in males and form the subfamily Corydalinae. The genera in which the males have normal mandibles, called fishflies, form the subfamily Chauliodinae. The summer fishfly, Chauliodes pectinicornis, is perhaps the best-known of these in North America; its immense mating swarms in the Upper Mississippi River region fill the air on a few summer nights each year much like mayflies in certain regions of Europe, leaving millions of carcasses to be cleaned up the next day.

The larvae are aquatic, active, armed with strong sharp mandibles, and breathe by means of abdominal branchial filaments. When full sized — which can take several years — they leave the water and spend a quiescent pupal stage on the land, in chambers dug under stones or logs, before metamorphosis into the sexually mature insect.

Genera
These 36 genera belong to the family Corydalidae:

 Acanthacorydalis c g
 Anachauliodes c g
 Apochauliodes c g
 Archichauliodes c g
 Chauliodes Latreille, 1796 i c g b – fishflies
 Chauliosialis c g
 Chloronia Banks, 1908 i c g
 Chloroniella c g
 Corydalites c g
 Corydalus Latreille, 1802 i c g b – dobsonflies
 Cratocorydalopsis c g
 Cretochaulus c g
 Ctenochauliodes c g
 Dysmicohermes Munroe, 1953 i c g b
 Eochauliodes c g
 Jurochauliodes c g
 Lithocorydalus c g
 Madachauliodes c g
 Neochauliodes c g
 Neohermes Banks, 1908 i c g b
 Neoneuromus c g
 Neurhermes c g
 Neuromus g
 Nevromus c g
 Nigronia Banks, 1908 i c g b – dark fishflies
 Nothochauliodes c g
 Orohermes Evans, 1984 i c g b
 Parachauliodes c g
 Platychauliodes c g
 Platyneuromus Weele, 1909 i c g
 Protochauliodes Weele, 1909 i c g b
 Protohermes  van-der Weele, 1907 g
 Puri c g
 Sinochauliodes c g
 Taeniochauliodes c g

Data sources: i = ITIS, c = Catalogue of Life, g = GBIF, b = Bugguide.net

Footnotes

References

External links

 Informative Corydalidae video

 
Megaloptera
Insect families